Alcaraz is a surname originally from Spain. Notable people with the name include:

 Antolín Alcaraz (born 1982), Paraguayan footballer
 Andrés Alcaraz (17th century), 15th Governor-General of the Philippines of the Philippines
 Aleix Alcaraz (born 1990), Spanish racing driver
 Arturo Alcaraz (1916–2001), Filipino volcanologist known for his work on geothermal energy
 Carlos Alcaraz (born 2003), Spanish tennis player
 Carlos Alcaraz (footballer) (born 2002) Argentine footballer
 David Alcaraz (born 1979), US scientist. Rugby Player for the US and Argentina
 Felipe Alcaraz (born 1943), Spanish politician
 Francisco Alcaraz (disambiguation), multiple people, including:
Francisco Alcaraz (footballer) (born 1960), Paraguayan footballer
Francisco Alcaraz (umpire) (1920–1996), Mexican League baseball umpire
 Gaylon Alcaraz (born 1970), community organizer and human rights activist
 J. P. Alcaraz, Filipino basketball player
 Juan Bosco Alcaraz (born 1984), Spanish volleyball player
 Lalo Alcaraz (born 1964), American cartoonist
 Lucas Alcaraz (born 1966), Spanish footballer
 Luis Alcaraz (born 1941), Puerto Rican baseball player
 Marco Alcaraz (born 1983), Filipino basketball player, actor and model
 Oscar M. Alcaraz (1953–1970), Filipino boy scout
 Ramón Alcaraz, officer in the Mexican Army and writer
 Ramon A. Alcaraz (1915–2009), officer in the Philippine Navy
 Rubén Alcaraz (born 1991), Spanish footballer